Vejvoda is a Czech surname derived from voivode. A female form is  Vejvodová. Notable people with the surname include:

 Goran Vejvoda (born 1956), Serbian record producer
 Jaromír Vejvoda (1902–1988), Czech composer
 Jaroslav Vejvoda (1920–1996), Czech footballer and manager
 Josef Vejvoda (born 1945), Czech musician
 Miroslav Vejvoda (born 1932), Czech sailor

See also
 
 28614 Vejvoda, main-belt asteroid

Czech-language surnames